Kandivali East Assembly constituency  is one of the 288 Vidhan Sabha (Legislative Assembly) constituencies in Maharashtra state in western India.

Overview
Kandivali East constituency is one of the 26 Vidhan Sabha constituencies located in the Mumbai Suburban district.

Kandivali East is part of the Mumbai North Lok Sabha constituency along with five other Vidhan Sabha segments, namely Borivali, Magathane, Dahisar, Charkop and Malad West in the Mumbai Suburban district.

Members of Legislative Assembly

Election results

2019 results

2014 results

2009 results

See also
 Kandivali
 List of constituencies of Maharashtra Vidhan Sabha

References

Assembly constituencies of Mumbai
Politics of Mumbai Suburban district
Assembly constituencies of Maharashtra